William Wilson (born 23 September 1936) is a former professional footballer from Northern Ireland. He played as a wing half. He started his career with his hometown club, Portadown, and made his debut for the club at the age of 16. In 1955, Wilson moved to England to join Football League First Division side Burnley and initially played in the reserves. He made his first appearance for the senior team in the 0–1 defeat to Blackpool on 1 May 1957, alongside fellow debutant Jim Appleby. Wilson played only one more match for Burnley, deputising for regular right-half Bobby Seith for the 0–7 loss against Nottingham Forest on 18 September 1957. He was released from his contract in May 1958 and despite interest from Crewe Alexandra and Notts County, he returned to Northern Ireland and signed for Linfield

Wilson spent six years at Linfield, including the 1961–62 season during which the team won seven trophies. He almost received a call-up to the Northern Ireland national football team for the 1958 FIFA World Cup, but was not selected due to the inclusion of Derek Dougan. Wilson departed Windsor Park in the summer of 1964 and subsequently spent some time with Ballymena United before retiring from football. He returned to Linfield for a spell as a coach, before becoming a school teacher, specialising in physical education.

References

Interview with Billy Wilson at the Linfield official website

1936 births
Living people
People from Portadown
Association footballers from Northern Ireland
Association football defenders
Portadown F.C. players
Burnley F.C. players
Linfield F.C. players
Ballymena United F.C. players
English Football League players